The 2005–06 British Collegiate American Football League season was the 21st full season of the BCAFL, organised by the British Students American Football Association (BSAFA, now the BAFA).

Changes from last season
Divisional Changes
There were no changes to the Divisional setup

Team Changes
Royal Holloway, University of London joined the Southern Conference, as the APU Phantoms
UKC Falcons changed their name back to Kent Falcons
This increased the number of teams in BCAFL to 37.

Regular season

Northern Conference, Scottish Division

Northern Conference, Eastern Division

Northern Conference, Western Division

Northern Conference, Central Division

Southern Conference, Central Division

Southern Conference, Eastern Division

Southern Conference, Western Division

Southern Conference, Southern Division

Playoffs

Note – the table does not indicate who played home or away in each fixture.

References

External links
 Official BUAFL Website
 Official BAFA Website

2005
2005 in British sport
2006 in British sport
2005 in American football
2006 in American football